The Cyrus B. Cobb House is a home built circa 1885 in White Bear Lake, Minnesota. Originally built as a private residence for C.B. Cobb, a prominent White Bear Lake businessman and lumber dealer, the home later served as a rectory for a local church, was known as White Bear Lake Tavern (or Curry's Tavern) from 1912 to 1923, and a private residence. The solid brick house was designed in the Queen Anne architectural style and is one of the few substantial year-round brick homes remaining in the community. It is the only private home in White Bear Lake on the National Register of Historic Places.

References

Houses completed in 1889
Houses on the National Register of Historic Places in Minnesota
Houses in Ramsey County, Minnesota
White Bear Lake, Minnesota
Queen Anne architecture in Minnesota
National Register of Historic Places in Ramsey County, Minnesota